Glolarnaca is a genus of Orthopterans, sometimes known as 'leaf-folding crickets' in the tribe Gryllacridini.  The recorded distribution is from China, Vietnam and Cambodia.

Glolarnaca was originally described as the subgenus Zalarnaca (Glolarnaca) by AV Gorochov; its elevation to genus level in subfamily Gryllacridinae has been accepted by authorities such as Cadena-Castañeda and Yang.  Species such as G. globiceps (originally identified from Cambodia and Vietnam) have also been placed in other more related genera such as Gryllacris and also Capnogryllacris.

Species 
The Orthoptera Species File lists:
 Glolarnaca elegantula (Ingrisch, 2018)
 Glolarnaca globiceps (Karny, 1929) (Indochina, 3 subspecies)
 Glolarnaca hainanica (Li, Liu & Li, 2016)
 Glolarnaca kunyui Yang, Lu & Bian, 2021
 Glolarnaca nigrimacula Yang, Lu & Bian, 2021
 Glolarnaca ornatula (Gorochov, 2008) - type species (as Zalarnaca ornatula Gorochov)
 Glolarnaca pulcherrima (Gorochov, 2008)
 Glolarnaca sinica (Li, Liu & Li, 2016)

References

External Links

Ensifera genera
Gryllacrididae
Orthoptera of Indo-China